Secrets And Falling is the 1991 EP from Cindytalk released by Midnight Music. "Empty Hand" differs slightly from the versions on Wappinschaw and the Sound From Hands compilation. Features images and samples from the film El Espiritu De La Colmena (Spain, 1973) by Victor Erice. Midnight Music folded shortly after this was released. Mara Bressi is a member of Black Rose.

Track listing
 Song of Changes
 The Moon Above Me
 In Sunshine
 Empty Hand

Personnel
Gordon Sharp – voice and tapes
Paul Middleton – drums and percussion
David Ros – guitar on "Song of Changes"
John Byrne – bass and guitar on "Song of Changes", "The Moon Above Me"
Darryl Moore – guitar on "In Sunshine", "Empty Hand"
Andrew Moon – drums on "Song of Changes"
Mara Bressi – additional voice on "The Moon Above Me"
Tracy Hankins – violin on "Empty Hand"
Lars Rudolph – trumpet on "In Sunshine"

Versions
 12inch 1991 Midnight Music, Cat# DONG 76
 CD 1991 Midnight Music, Cat# DONG 76 CD

References

External links
 Official Cindytalk Website
 "Of ghosts and buildings", Cindytalk blog
 Cindytalk Myspace page
 Discogs entry for Cindytalk
 Editions Mego website, Cindytalk page

1991 EPs
Cindytalk albums